Ironside is an American 1967 crime novel by Jim Thompson based on the television series Ironside.

Plot
Robert T. Ironside, a detective who needs to use a wheelchair for mobility, tracks down a faceless murderer stalking San Francisco.

References

Novels by Jim Thompson
1967 American novels
English-language novels